Pesma za Evroviziju is a Serbian song contest organized by Radio Television of Serbia (RTS) in collaboration with SkyMusic.

Background 
In October 2021, it was announced that Beovizija would no longer be used to select the Serbian entry for the Eurovision Song Contest, as the company that owns the rights to the Beovizija brand, Megaton, decided not to renew its contract with RTS. In place of Beovizija, a new selection was planned out under the working title RTS Takmičenje za Pesmu Evrovizije. The final title was later revealed to be Pesma za Evroviziju.

Visual identity 

The general slogan is based off the beggining letters of the words "song", "Eurovision" and "Serbia" in cyrilic, with the name of the contest written next to it.

Rules and format 
The contest consists of two semi-finals and a final. In each show, the jury and the televoting award 12, 10 and 8–1 points to their 10 favourite songs. In the semi-finals, half of the songs which received the most points advance to the final. In the final, the song with the most points is declared the winner. In case of a tie, the song that received more points from the televoting is deemed to have finished higher. In case of a tie in the jury votes, the song that received more 12 points is deemed to have finished higher. If the tie is not broken, the process is repeated with the other points from highest to lowest until the draw is resolved. In case the draw cannot be resolved this way, the order in which the president of the jury ranked the songs will be used to determine the ranking. In case the president of the jury had not voted for multiple songs in the draw, they have to decide the ranking in written form as soon as the combined points from all jurors are known. In case multiple songs receive the same amount of televotes, the amount of televotes at the 10-minute mark of the televoting determines their ranking. If the tie is still not broken, the process is repeated with the televotes at the 5-minute mark. In the event that the televoting results cannot be obtained, only the jury determines the ranking of the contestants.

Contestants 
All participants must be at least 16 years old on 1 May of the year in which Pesma za Evroviziju is held. All singers must be citizens of Serbia, while there are no nationality limitations as to who can enter as a songwriter. At most, six people are allowed to be a part of a single performance.

Songs 
The competing entries must not have been released partially or in full before 1 September of the previous year (for example, Pesma za Evroviziju '22 songs must not have been released before 1 September 2021). The songs can be three minutes long at most. The lyrics have to be written in one of the official languages of Serbia, although this rule isn't strictly enforced.

Presenters 

 is the presenter of the programme each year with another guest presenter that changes yearly, while the green room hosts are Kristina Radenković and Stefan Popović.

Editions

Gallery

References 

Eurovision Song Contest selection events
Serbia in the Eurovision Song Contest
Music festivals in Serbia
Song contests
Recurring events established in 2021
2021 establishments in Serbia
Music festivals established in 2021
Music television series